Joshua's Hill, a hill located on the Anatolian shore of Bosporus in Beykoz district of Istanbul, Turkey is a shrine containing a mosque and a tomb dedicated to Yusha. At the summit of the hill is a terrace with benches for the comfort of pilgrims visiting the mosque and the tomb of Saint Joshua. To the north of the hill, Yoros Castle is situated.

Tomb of Joshua

At the top of the hill, a giant symbolic grave stands, known to the Europeans as the "Giant's Grave". It is believed by some Muslims to be the tomb of Yusha. Alternative traditional sites for his tomb are situated in Israel (the Shia shrine at Al-Nabi Yusha'), Jordan (An-Nabi Yusha' bin Noon, a Sunni shrine near the city of Al-Salt) and Iraq (the Nabi Yusha' shrine of Baghdad).

The roofless area is surrounded with a high cast-iron grate, enclosed by means of an iron netting. The point is that the local inhabitants consider the grave miraculous and come here in order to be healed of their illnesses. But, the iron netting prevents the pilgrim from touching the holy ground inside the fence.

The ground is overgrown with thick grass. Several high trees grow. At the opposite end of the grave are two circular cylindrical stones, which are reminiscent of small millstones. In the center of one of them are seen a quadrangular opening and a very noticeable fissure. All this is enclosed by a stone wall, in which two doors and several windows have been made. The pilgrims enter one of the doors, pass around the grave in a circle and exit outside through a second door.

Yuşa Mosque
Yuşa Mosque was built by Grand Vizier Yirmisekizzade Mehmed Said Pasha in 1755 with an adjacent shrine. This small mosque had stone walls and a split roof structure because it was burnt. The mosque was restored during the reign of Ottoman Sultan Abdulaziz in 1863.

See also
List of ziyarat locations
Ziyarat

References

External links
 Yuşa Tepesi (photo)
 The Zigzags Of Our History

Hills of Turkey
Religious buildings and structures in Turkey
Buildings and structures in Istanbul
Tourist attractions in Istanbul
Bosphorus
Landforms of Istanbul Province
Islamic shrines